Adriano de Jesús Sánchez Roa (born 24 January 1956) is a politician, economist and writer from the Dominican Republic. He is Senator for the province of Elías Piña, elected in 2006, and re-elected in 2010, with 60.05% of the votes.

He has been described as one of the most hardworking senators.

Works 
"Influencias de las Leyes Agrarias en el Cultivo del Arroz" (1981)
"Café: Situación y Perspectivas" (1984)
"La Crisis Arrocera" (1985)
"La Reforma Agraria no ha llenado las Expectativas Creadas a Familias Campesinas" (1986)
"Políticas Inflacionarias en los Productos Alimenticios de Origen Agropecuario" (1986)
"Determinantes Estructurales en la Producción Cacaotalera" (1986)
"Los Intermediarios en 25 Rubros Agropecuarios" (1987)
"La Inflación en el Sector Agropecuario" (1988)
"Consecuencias de la Insuficiencia del Crédito Estatal en el Agro". (1988)
"Campesinos, Crisis Agropecuaria e Inflación" (1989)
"En Tiempos Caracoles" (1990)
"Los Dueños del Café" (1990)
"FMI, Agricultura y Pobreza" (1991)
"Los Desamparados de la Tierra: 30 años de Reforma Agraria" (1992)
"Cuando el Amor Nace en Primavera" (1996)
"Pensamiento Social Agrario de Joaquín Balaguer" (1997)
"Los Amores Inmortales" (1999)
"Capilla Sin Dios" (1999)
"Otros Cuentos en el Mismo Exilio" (1999)
"El Amor en el Rocío de la Noche"
"Eloísa Quiere Casarse" (2004)
"Contigo Voy a la Gloria" (2005)

References 

Living people
1956 births
People from Elías Piña Province
Dominican Liberation Party politicians
Social Christian Reformist Party politicians
Dominican Republic male writers
Santo Domingo Institute of Technology alumni
University of Panama alumni
Members of the Senate of the Dominican Republic